Silvia Moi (born 26 July 1978 in Kvinesdal, Vest-Agder) is a Norwegian opera singer. She has been a soloist with the Norwegian National Opera and Ballet since 2006.  She appeared in Kenneth Branagh's 2006 film adaptation of The Magic Flute.

References

External links
 
 

Living people
1978 births
21st-century Norwegian women opera singers
People from Kvinesdal